The following is the complete discography of August Burns Red, a Pennsylvanian metalcore band. Their releases have so far consisted of nine full-length studio albums, seven EPs, three live albums, three video albums, three remix albums, twenty-four singles, twenty-six music videos, one demo and ten other appearances.

Albums

Studio albums

Live albums

Remix albums

Video albums

Singles

Other charted songs

Extended plays

Demos

Music videos

Other appearances 
 Youngbloods II: A Solid State Sampler (2006)
 This Is Solid State, Volume 6 (2007)
 X Christmas (2008)
 Punk Goes Pop Volume Two (2009)
 Songs from the Penalty Box, Solid State Vol. 7 (2009)
 Atticus... Dragging the Lake IV (2009)
 Happy Christmas, Vol. 5 (2010)
 I Am Solid State Sampler (2010)
 Punk Goes Pop Vol. 6 (2014)
 Punk Goes Christmas: Deluxe Edition (2015)

References 

Discography
Heavy metal group discographies
Discographies of American artists